Anaxandridas I (reigned from c. 675 to c. 645 BC) was king of Sparta and a member of the Eurypontid dynasty. He was succeeded by king Archidamus I.

7th-century BC rulers
7th-century BC Spartans
Eurypontid kings of Sparta